The Iran Men's National Wheelchair Basketball Team is the wheelchair basketball side that represents Iran in international competitions for men as part of the International Wheelchair Basketball Federation.

Current roster

The team's current roster for the 2014 Wheelchair Basketball World Championship is:

Competitions
The Iran men's team has not competed at the Wheelchair Basketball World Championship, however it has placed behind Japan twice at the 2004 & 2008 & 2016 Summer Paralympics.

2015 IWBF Asia-Oceania Championship

Wheelchair Basketball World Championship

Summer Paralympics

References

National men's wheelchair basketball teams
Wheelchair basketball
National mens